The Missing Guest is a 1938 American mystery-comedy film directed by John Rawlins.  It is a remake of the 1933 film Secret of the Blue Room.

Synopsis
A newspaper reporter is sent by his editor to spend a night in a country house where a notorious murder had been committed exactly twenty years before.

Cast

Production
The Missing Guest was the first of two remakes of the 1933 film Secret of the Blue Room. The film was budgeted at $80,400 and was completed under budget, at $72,000.

Music in The Missing Guest is recycled from previous films including Werewolf of London and Dracula's Daughter.

Release
The Missing Guest was distributed by Universal Pictures on August 12, 1938.

Reception
From contemporary reviews, "Hobe." of Variety referred to the film as a "feeble whodunnit for bottom billing" and that "Every outdated [haunted house] situation and piece of business is included - not only included, but embarrassingly highlighted." The New York World-American stated that "[I]f you know your mystery stories at all, you must know by now how unfunny a couple of presumably comic detectives can be when they get mixed up with spooks, sliding panels, and clutching hands" and found that the film "is a feeble and fumbling attempt at being eerie and funny" Kate Cameron of The New York Daily News said that the comedy in the film was "such feeble fooling that it entirely destroys its purpose and merely serves to shatter whatever illusion the murder and the mystery might otherwise hold for the audience." Frank S. Nugent of The New York Times declared "The cast does as little with it as it deserves, and that is little enough."

In their book on Universal Horror films, the authors stated that "mile-a-minute wisecracks and inane humor stand in for atmosphere and chills" declaring the film to be a "dismal mystery-comedy that serves up none of either." and declaring it to be "one of the worst Universal mysteries of the '30s."

References

Footnotes

Sources

External links
 

1938 films
1938 mystery films
American mystery films
Films directed by John Rawlins
Universal Pictures films
Remakes of American films
1930s English-language films
1930s American films